Otto Bock (February 21, 1881 – August 15, 1942) was a justice of the Colorado Supreme Court.

Biography
Bock was born and raised in Milwaukee, Wisconsin. He graduated from the John Marshall Law School. On August 24, 1911, Bock married Hilda Helen Schabarum. They had three children. Bock died on August 15, 1942, in Denver, Colorado. He was a Lutheran.

Career
Bock served on the State Supreme Court from 1939 until his death. Previously, he was an Assistant United States Attorney.

References

Politicians from Milwaukee
Colorado lawyers
Justices of the Colorado Supreme Court
John Marshall Law School (Chicago) alumni
1881 births
1942 deaths
American Lutherans
20th-century American judges
Lawyers from Milwaukee
20th-century American lawyers
20th-century Lutherans